Minuscule 75 (in the Gregory-Aland numbering), ε 176 (von Soden), known as Codex Genevensis, is a Greek minuscule manuscript of the New Testament, on parchment leaves. Palaeographically it has been assigned to the 11th century. The codex has complex contents. It was adapted for liturgical use. It has complex contents, and full marginalia.

Description 

The codex contains complete text of the four Gospels on 484 leaves (size ). The text is written in one column per page, 19 lines per page. The initial letters in red. Two paper leaves were added in the 16th century at the end of the codex.

There is also another division according to the Ammonian Sections (in Matthew 359, in Mark 236 - 16:13, in Luke 342, in John 232 sections), with references to the Eusebian Canons.

Text 

The Greek text of the codex is a representative of the Byzantine text-type. Hermann von Soden classified it to the textual family Kx. Aland placed it in Category V. 
Textually it is close to minuscule 6.
According to the Claremont Profile Method it belongs to the textual cluster 1167, and creates textual pair with 2229.

History 

In 1702 Leger presented the manuscript to the Library in Geneva. It was seen in 1714 by Wettstein, collated by Scholz, Cellérier, and Henri Omont (as Evv. 1). Gregory saw the manuscript in 1883. Hoskier gave a collation of the codex.

It is currently housed in the Bibliothèque de Genève (Gr. 19), in Geneva.

See also 

 List of New Testament minuscules
 Biblical manuscript
 Textual criticism

References

Further reading 

 Herman C. Hoskier, A Full Account and Collation of the Greek Cursive Codex Evangelium 604 (London, 1890).

Greek New Testament minuscules
11th-century biblical manuscripts